Bridgewater is a town in Litchfield County, Connecticut, United States. The population was 1,662 at the 2020 census, down from 1,727 at the 2010 census.

Bridgewater is well known as being a weekend getaway for wealthy New Yorkers, due to its scenic wooded areas, location on the banks of Lake Lillinonah and close proximity to New York City. Bridgewater was the only remaining dry town in Connecticut until voters approved the sale of alcohol in a 2014 referendum, by a 660–246 vote. The Bridgewater Country Fair is a popular annual event held every August, attracting visitors from all over New England and the Tri-state area.

Geography

Bridgewater is in southwestern Litchfield County and is bordered by Fairfield County to the south and New Haven County to the southeast. Bridgewater is located on the northeast bank of the Housatonic River, on a section that is impounded to form Lake Lillinonah.

Demographics

As of the census of 2000, there were 1,824 people, 703 households, and 525 families residing in the town. The racial makeup of the town was 97.53% White, 0.93% African American, 0.05% Native American, 0.71% Asian, 0.11% from other races, and 0.66% from two or more races. Hispanic or Latino of any race were 0.49% of the population.

There were 703 households, out of which 29.4% had children under the age of 18 living with them, 67.4% were married couples living together, 5.5% had a female householder with no husband present, and 25.2% were non-families. 21.1% of all households were made up of individuals, and 8.1% had someone living alone who was 65 years of age or older.  The average household size was 2.55 and the average family size was 2.96.

In the town, the population was spread out, with 22.1% under the age of 18, 4.9% from 18 to 24, 23.8% from 25 to 44, 35.9% from 45 to 64, and 13.3% who were 65 years of age or older.  The median age was 45 years. For every 100 females, there were 98.0 males.  For every 100 females age 18 and over, there were 95.5 males.

The median income for a household in the town was $80,420, and the median income for a family was $94,720. Males had a median income of $61,750 versus $40,455 for females. The per capita income for the town was $42,505.  About 2.3% of families and 4.1% of the population were below the poverty line, including 4.8% of those under age 18 and 0.8% of those age 65 or over.

Transportation
Bridgewater is served by two state highways: Route 67 running east–west in the northern part of town, and Route 133 running north–south. Route 67 leads northwest to New Milford and east to Roxbury, while Route 133 leads south across the Housatonic River into Brookfield. The Danbury Metro-North Railroad station is located roughly 10 miles from the town center.

Local media

Waterbury Republican-American, a Waterbury-based independent daily newspaper
The News-Times, a Danbury-based daily newspaper
The Greater New Milford Spectrum, a MediaNews Group-owned weekly paper
Voices, a local newspaper serving Southbury, Middlebury, Oxford, Seymour, Naugatuck, Woodbury, Bethelhem, New Preston, Washington, Washington Depot, Roxbury, Bridgewater, Monroe, Sandy Hook and Newtown

Education
Regional School District 12 is the area school district. Residents are served by REACH Preschool in Washington, Burnham Elementary School in Bridgewater, and Shepaug Valley School (secondary school) in Washington.

The Burnham Library

In 1904, the Bridgewater Library Association was established, succeeding previous lending libraries operated by individuals in town. In 1909 room for library purposes was set aside in recently built town hall. A bequest from William Dixon Burnham, a native who made his fortune in shipping, allowed a Greek Revival style building to be erected from 1925 to 1926, using Mine Hill granite from nearby Roxbury.  The dedication took place on August 26, 1926.

By the early 1960s, the library's two floors were finally becoming cramped. With the death of town resident Van Wyck Brooks, a biographer and critic, a "Van Wyck Brooks Memorial Fund was set up to raise money for a library wing in his name. The effort, however, flopped, despite support from such celebrities as Pearl Buck and Archibald MacLeish. Just enough money was raised for a bust of the author and a display of some of his memorabilia. His desk, books, and other items can be found on display in the library's biography section. The fund-raising committee disbanded in 1972, but a year later, a surprising source of funding became known.

Charles E. Piggott, a hermit, misanthrope, and miser living in a Los Angeles slum, died in 1973.  As a bulldozer operator razed the shack that had been Piggott's home, the operator happened to notice something shiny. It was a bottle with Piggott's holographic will inside.

Despite apparently having no discernible connection with Bridgewater, Piggott left the fund $300,000—money from careful investments over the years. The state of California contested the will and the library hired a lawyer, at considerable cost, to defend the bequest. Eventually, the lawyer won the case and the library got $210,000.

By 1980, the Van Wyck Brooks Memorial Wing was dedicated, doubling the size of the library.

Burton Bernstein, a longtime town resident, looked into why Piggott would leave money to the library, then wrote an article on the bequest, which appeared in the December 18, 1978, issue of The New Yorker. Piggott, as it turned out, had been a voracious reader on any number of subjects and loved public libraries (which are, after all, free). Bernstein believes that Piggott came across Van Wyck Brooks' The Flowering of New England, which describes the hermit Henry David Thoreau. Piggott may have compared himself to Thoreau, or saw wisdom in some of Thoreau's ideas as presented by Brooks. Perhaps this quote stuck in his mind: "The mass of men led lives of quiet desperation… Did they not know that the wisest had always lived, with respect to comforts and luxuries, a life more simple and meager than the poor?… Poverty had given him all this wealth."

Piggott heard of the Van Wyck Brooks Memorial Fund, recognized the name, and, Bernstein believes, decided to contribute.

Notable people

 Woody Allen, film director, writer, actor, and comedian
 Cathie Black, media executive and New York City Schools Chancellor
 Dan Briody. author
 Van Wyck Brooks (1886–1963), long-time town resident, was a literary critic, biographer, and historian
 Philip Evergood, artist
 Mia Farrow, actress
 Louise Fitzhugh, author of children's books including Harriet the Spy
 Susie Gharib, business news journalist
 Kathy Godfrey, talk show host
 Susan Kinsolving, author and poet
 E.G. Marshall (1914–1998), actor
 Lanford Monroe (1950–2000), wildlife artist and sculptor
 Mike Nichols (1931–2014), film and theater director, producer, actor, and comedian
 Diane Sawyer, television broadcast journalist
 Charles Seeger, noted musicologist and composer
 Luman Hamlin Weller, congressman from Iowa
 Teresa Wright, Academy Award-winning actress

References

External links

Town of Bridgewater official website
Burnham Library, the town public library
Regional School District 12 
Northwest Connecticut Convention and Visitors Bureau
Northwest Connecticut Arts Council
Bridgewater Fair

 
Towns in Litchfield County, Connecticut
Towns in the New York metropolitan area
Towns in Connecticut